Eric Dayton Prentice (August 22, 1926 — December 8, 2002) was a Canadian professional ice hockey left winger who played a total of 5 games in the National Hockey League (NHL) for the Toronto Maple Leafs during the 1943–44 season. The rest of his career, which lasted from 1943 to 1950, was spent in different minor leagues. Prentice holds the record for the youngest player signed by the Toronto Maple Leafs - he was 17. His brother Dean had a long career in the NHL, mainly with the New York Rangers, the Boston Bruins and the Detroit Red Wings.

Career
Prentice played the 1942–43 season with the Timmins Buffalo Ankerites in the Thunder Bay Junior A Hockey League. He then spent the 1943–44 season playing with Providence-Hershey in the American Hockey League. He made his only appearance in the NHL when he played five games for the Toronto Maple Leafs. During those five games, he failed to record a point and spent 4 minutes in the penalty box. In 1944–45, he played with the Pittsburgh Hornets in the American Hockey League.  He then split the 1945–46 season between the Omaha Knights in the United States Hockey League and the Hollywood Wolves in the Pacific Coast Hockey League. He went back to the Wolves in 1946–47.
Next he then played for the Fresno Falcons in 1947–48.  He then spent 1948–49 with the Philadelphia Rockets before ending his professional career in 1949–50 in Oakland-LA-Fresno in the PCHL.

Post-hockey
Prentice was the father of former Premier of Alberta Jim Prentice. Prentice died on December 8, 2002 in Coleman, Alberta from amyotrophic lateral sclerosis.

Career statistics

Regular season and playoffs

References

1926 births
2002 deaths
Canadian ice hockey left wingers
Deaths from motor neuron disease
Fresno Falcons players
Hershey Bears players
Hollywood Wolves players
Ice hockey people from Ontario
Neurological disease deaths in Alberta
Omaha Knights (USHL) players
Pittsburgh Hornets players
Philadelphia Rockets players
Providence Reds players
Toronto Maple Leafs players
Oakland Oaks (PCHL) players
Sportspeople from Timmins